The Hajiqabul–Astara–Abadan pipeline is a natural gas pipeline from Kazi Magomed in Azerbaijan to Iran.

History
The pipeline was agreed between Iran and the Soviet Union in 1965.  It was inaugurated in October 1970 in Astara by Mohammad Rezā Shāh Pahlavi and Nikolai Podgorny, Chairman of the Presidium of the Supreme Soviet.  In 1971–1979, Southern Caucasus republics of the Soviet Union were supplied through this pipeline by natural gas from Iran. Soviets, in return, agreed to transfer the technology of heavy machinery manufacturing, which led to the foundation of Machine Sazi Arak and to construct Esfahan Steel Complex. After Iranian Revolution Iranian supplies were cut off. 

In 2006, Azerbaijan began a swap deal with Iran, providing gas through the Baku-Astara line to Iran; while Iran supplies Nakhchivan. On 11 November 2009, the State Oil Company of Azerbaijan (SOCAR) and National Iranian Gas Company signed a memorandum according to which Azerbaijani will supply 500 million cubic meters of natural gas per year starting from 2010.

Technical features
The Iranian section of the pipeline is known as IGAT1.

References 

Energy infrastructure completed in 1970
Energy in Western Asia
Natural gas pipelines in Azerbaijan
Natural gas pipelines in Iran
Caspian Sea
Azerbaijan–Iran relations
Iran–Soviet Union relations
Natural gas pipelines in the Soviet Union